The 1979 Cincinnati Reds season consisted of the Reds winning the National League West under their first-year manager John McNamara, with a record of 90-71, 1½ games better than the Houston Astros. It was a year of great change for the Reds, who lost long-time star Pete Rose to the Philadelphia Phillies, who signed Rose as an unrestricted free agent. Also, long-time manager and future Hall of Famer Sparky Anderson was fired by new general manager Dick Wagner when Anderson refused to make changes in his coaching staff. McNamara guided the Reds to its first West Division title in three years. Wagner replaced long-time GM Bob Howsam, who retired after running the Reds for 12 years. Through some good drafts and several key trades, Howsam built a team that won six division titles, and played in four World Series, winning two, during the 1970s.

However, the Reds lost the National League Championship Series to the eventual World Series champion Pittsburgh Pirates in three straight games. It was the first time in four tries the Pirates had upended the Reds in a league championship series since Major League Baseball began divisional play in 1969. It would be Cincinnati's last postseason appearance until 1990. 

The Reds played their home games at Riverfront Stadium.

Offseason
 January 9, 1979: Bill Bordley was drafted by the Reds in 1979, but the pick was voided.

Regular season

Season standings

Record vs. opponents

Notable transactions 
 May 8, 1979: Paul Blair was signed as a free agent by the Reds.
 May 25, 1979: Champ Summers was traded by the Reds to the Detroit Tigers for a player to be named later. The Tigers completed the deal by sending Sheldon Burnside to the Reds on October 25.
 June 5, 1979: Jeff Jones was drafted by the Reds in the 20th round of the 1979 Major League Baseball Draft.
 June 28, 1979: Pedro Borbón was traded by the Reds to the San Francisco Giants for Héctor Cruz.

Roster

Player stats

Batting

Starters by position 
Note: Pos = Position; G = Games played; AB = At bats; H = Hits; Avg. = Batting average; HR = Home runs; RBI = Runs batted in

Other batters 
Note: G = Games played; AB = At bats; H = Hits; Avg. = Batting average; HR = Home runs; RBI = Runs batted in

Pitching

Starting pitchers 
Note: G = Games pitched; IP = Innings pitched; W = Wins; L = Losses; ERA = Earned run average; SO = Strikeouts

Other pitchers 
Note: G = Games pitched; IP = Innings pitched; W = Wins; L = Losses; ERA = Earned run average; SO = Strikeouts

Relief pitchers 
Note: G = Games pitched; W = Wins; L = Losses; SV = Saves; ERA = Earned run average; SO = Strikeouts

National League Championship Series

Game 1 
October 2, Riverfront Stadium

Game 2 
October 3, Riverfront Stadium

Game 3 
October 5, Three Rivers Stadium

Farm system 

LEAGUE CHAMPIONS: Nashville

Notes

References 
1979 Cincinnati Reds season at Baseball Reference

Cincinnati Reds seasons
Cincinnati Reds season
National League West champion seasons
Cinc